Lê Ngọc Bình (黎玉玶, 1785   – 1810) was a Vietnamese princess, youngest daughter of Emperor Lê Hiển Tông of Lê dynasty. Her early life was unknown, when the Tây Sơn dynasty succeeded Lê dynasty as the official dynasty of Vietnam; Emperor Quang Trung ordered his Crown Prince Nguyễn Quang Toản (later Emperor Cảnh Thịnh) to marry her.

In 1801, Nguyễn Ánh's force, main rival of Tây Sơn, captured Phú Xuân and forced Cảnh Thịnh flee to Tonkin and left Lê Ngọc Bình and his wives behind. Nguyễn Ánh captured but did not threaten Bình; then Ánh married her regardless of dissuasions of his followers.

Later, Nguyễn Ánh became Emperor Gia Long and gave her the royal title Đệ Tam Cung (roughly Third Wife or Third Concubine). Bình had with emperor Gia Long four children: prince Nguyen Phuc Quan, prince Nguyen Phuc Cu, princess An Nghia Ngoc Ngon, and princess My Khue Ngoc Khue. Le Thi Ngoc Binh died in 1810 and was buried in Trúc Lâm, Thừa Thiên Huế.

Notes

References
  

Lê dynasty princesses
1785 births
1810 deaths
Gia Long
Tây Sơn dynasty empresses
18th-century Vietnamese women
19th-century Vietnamese women